Bolitaena pygmaea is a species of Octopoda in the family Amphitretidae.

References 

Animals described in 1884